Andrew Gallacher (born 28 March 1986) is a British rally driver from Girvan. He was Scottish Rally Champion in 2018. He is the son of four time Scottish Rally Champion Drew Gallacher.

Career
His first rally was in 2010 on a round of the Scottish Rally Championship driving a Mitsubishi EVO. Varying results came over the following years whilst driving various cars including a Subaru Impreza, Ford Escort Mk2 and a Ford Fiesta 4x4.

Success came in 2018 behind the wheel of a Ford Focus WRC when alongside regular co-driver Jane Nicol he won the Scottish Rally Championship. The pair won 2 out of the 6 events held that year and this was enough to see them crowned champions.

References

External links
 Andrew Gallacher - EWRC Profile page
 AG Motorsport - Official Website

Living people
Scottish Rally Championship
Scottish rally drivers
1986 births